Gilad Kariv (born 30 November 1973) is an Israeli Reform rabbi, attorney and politician. The Executive Director of the Israel Movement for Reform and Progressive Judaism, he is currently a member of the Knesset for the Labor Party.

Biography
Kariv was born and educated in Tel Aviv. His involvement with the Reform Movement began in high school, when he joined the Beit Daniel Synagogue, the Center of Progressive movement in Tel Aviv. Once completing his secondary education at Lady Davis High School, Gilad volunteered for a Service Year in the Hebrew Scouts, and worked on establishing educational Nahal groups.

Kariv served in the Israel Defense Forces Intelligence Corps under the Haman Talpiot program. Following five years of service, during which he completed the officers program with honors, Kariv went to study at the Hebrew University of Jerusalem. In 2001, he earned a bachelor's degree in law and Jewish studies. In 2001–2002 he interned in the Supreme Court of the State Attorney Office. In 2003, he received a master's degree in Jewish studies at Hebrew Union College in Jerusalem. In 2004, he was certified as a lawyer by the Israel Bar Association. In 2008, Kariv received a master's degree in constitutional law from Northwestern University in Chicago, through a combined program with Tel Aviv University.

During his academic studies, Kariv established Progressive Movement student networks on campuses around the country. Following the economic sanctions of 2002, Kariv was one of the founding members of the Social Organizations Forum, and was active in several social initiatives, such as the single mothers protest. In 2003, Kariv was ordained at a reform teacher at the HUC. Among his posts, Kariv served as a leader at Congregation Beit Daniel in Tel Aviv until 2008.

Between 2003–2009, Kariv served as the director of the Israel Religious Action Center, and headed Reform movement public and legal initiatives in Israel on issues of freedom of religion, relation between religion and state, conversion, and many other social causes.

In 2009, Kariv was appointed executive director of the IMPJ. Since then, he has worked to expand the work of the movement, advance its standing with the Israeli public, establish new Reform congregations around the country, and obtain government recognition of the movement's activities.

Kariv publishes opinion pieces in the news and online. He has published several position papers on a variety of topics, including a proposal for the re-organization of religious service provisions in Israel, a suggestion for separation of religious institutions from state bodies, Israeli public space on the Sabbath and a report on the crisis of conversion. Kariv is regularly invited to represent the Reform movement before Knesset committees and in a variety of other public settings. Between 2006 and 2009, Kariv took part in the Knesset Constitution, Law and Justice Committee's discussions over the proposed writing of an Israeli constitution. In these meetings, Kariv represented the liberal Zionist point of view. Together with his colleagues at the IMPJ, Kariv proposed constitutional principles for the State of Israel.

As a representative of the Reform movement, Kariv serves as a board member at the Jewish Federation Institute for Jewish Learning, and as a board member in the Menucha Nechona organization, which works to advance civil burials in Israel. Between 2008 and 2011, Kariv also served as a committee member at the Israel Broadcasting Authority.

Kariv ran in the 2012 Israeli Labor Party primary elections, winning 27th place on the party's list for the 2013 Knesset elections. The party won only 15 seats. In December 2014, he informed Labor Party Chairman Isaac Herzog that he would be running for a spot on the Labor list for the 2015 elections. In January 2021, Kariv ran again in the Labor Party's primary election for the 2021 Knesset elections and placed fourth on the party's slate.

As a result he was elected to the Knesset in 2021. As a Member of Knesset, he is vehemently opposed to the proposed "Police Reform" proposed by Minister of Interior, Itamar Ben Gvir. 

Kariv helped lead the efforts to establish an egalitarian praying platform at the Western Wall, resulting in a government resolution officially recognizing the right for egalitarian prayer at the end of January 2016.

Kariv lives in Givatayim with his wife and three children.

References

External links
 "A Reform rabbi in the Knesset? Gilad Kariv, head of Israeli Reform, is mulling a run", JTA, 24 October 2012]
 "Reform Rabbi Gilad Kariv on the privatization of Jewish identity and the tycoons of religion", Haaretz, 27 September 2012
 Israel Movement for Progressive Judaism (Hebrew) | (English)
 Israel Religious Action Center founded by the IMPJ
 "Gilad Kariv: The Labor candidate who could be the first Reform rabbi MK", The Jerusalem Post, 4 February 2021

1973 births
Living people
Israeli Labor Party politicians
Hebrew University of Jerusalem alumni
Israeli lawyers
Israeli Reform rabbis
Members of the 24th Knesset (2021–2022)
Members of the 25th Knesset (2022–)
Rabbinic members of the Knesset